Lato is a humanist sans-serif typeface designed by Łukasz Dziedzic. It was released in 2010. The name "Lato" is Polish for "summer".

As of August 2018, Lato is used on more than 9.6 million websites, and is the third most served font on Google Fonts, with over one billion views per day.

Use 
Lato has been used in various physical publications, including information signs and election campaign billboards. It is the main font used on iCollege, Georgia State University's primary learning management system.

Development
Lato was created in 2010 for a Polish bank by Łukasz Dziedzic. When the bank changed its stylistic vision, he shelved the typeface, and released it later that year under the libre SIL Open Font License.

After Lato was added to Google Fonts it quickly gained popularity, becoming the third most used web font after Google's own Roboto and Open Sans, with over one billion views per day as of August 2018.

Carlito is a forked typeface which is very similar to Lato, it is released by Google with metrics compatible with Microsoft's Calibri typeface.

Language support 
Lato supports all Latin alphabets, along with Cyrillic, Greek, and IPA.

Derivatives 

The Lato typeface is available in nine weights from hairline to black, each of which has a distinct italic variant. Each of these 18 variants is additionally available in a Lato Latin version, containing just the subset of glyphs required for European languages based on the Latin alphabet; this allows for smaller file sizes. 

An update to Lato was made in 2014 with additional glyphs. This updated version was marketed as “Lato 2.0”.

References

External links 

 
 Lato source on GitHub

Humanist sans-serif typefaces
Free software Unicode typefaces
Typefaces and fonts introduced in 2010